Gina Marie Higginbottom  (née Awoko) is a British academic, nurse, midwife, health visitor and a specialist in international migration and maternity. She is the first nurse of black and minority ethnic (BME) origin to hold a professorial role in a Russell Group university in England.

Personal life and education

Higginbottom was born in     Sheffield and is of white British and Ghanaian origin (Ga-Mashie, Jamestown, Accra. She is via her maternal family a descendant of the historic Bagley family. Edward Bagley of Dudley, executed the will of Lady Barnham, granddaughter of William Shakespeare  She passed the eleven plus examination and attended King Ecgbert Technical Grammar School for Girls. She gained her PhD co-supervised by Prof James Nazroo at the University of Sheffield in 2004. Higginbottom was the first BME nurse to be awarded a National Primary Care Fellowship.

Career

From 2007 to 2015 Higginbottom held a Tier II Canada Research Chair in Ethnicity and Health at the University of Alberta. She is the first woman of BME origin to hold a  Canada Research Chair.

Higginbottom was appointed in 2015 as the Mary Seacole Professor of Ethnicity and Community Health at the University of Nottingham. As of 2019, she is now Emeritus Professor.

She is Co-Convener of the International Collaboration for Community Health Nursing Research (ICCHNR), a charity and professional organisation. She is also a member of the Chief Nurse for England's Black Minority Ethnic Advisory Group. In 2019 she became a vice-president of the Community Practitioners’ and Health Visitors’ Association (CPHVA), a professional organisation and trade union for nurses, together with Sara Rowbotham.

Honours
Higginbottom was awarded an MBE (Member of the Order of the British Empire) in the Queen's Birthday Honours list in 1998 for services to health promotion and young people.

Selected works 
 Higginbottom GMA, Evans C, Morgan M, Bharj K K, Eldridge J and Hussain B (2020) Interventions that improve maternity care for immigrant women in England: a narrative synthesis systematic review Health Serv Deliv Res 2020:03 DOI:10.3310/hsdr08140
Higginbottom GMA, Evans C, Morgan M, Bharj K K, Eldridge J and Hussain B (2019) Immigrant women’s experience of maternity care services in the UK:a narrative synthesis review BMJ Open DOI:10.1136/bmjopen-2019-029478
 Higginbottom GMA, Vallianatos H, Shankar J, Safipour J and Davey C, (2017).Immigrant women’s food choices in pregnancy: Perspectives from women of Chinese origin in Canada Ethnicity and Health. 
 Higginbottom, G, Evans, C, Morgan, M, Bharj, K, Eldridge, J and Hussain, B, (2017).Interventions that improve maternity care for immigrant women in the UK: Protocol for a narrative synthesis systematic review BMJ Open. 7, e016988
 Evans, C, Tweheyo, R, Mcgarry, J, Eldridge, J, Mccormick, C, Nkoyo, V and Higginbottom, G, (2017).What are the experiences of seeking, receiving and providing FGM-related healthcare? Perspectives of health professionals and women/girls who have undergone FGM: Protocol for a systematic review of qualitative evidence, BMJ Open. 7, 
 Higginbottom GMA, Safipour J, O'brien B, Mumtaz Z, Paton P, Chiu Y and Barolia R, (2016).An ethnographic investigation of maternity healthcare experience of immigrants in rural and urban Alberta, Canada: DOI: 10.1186/s12884-015-0773-z BMC Pregnancy and Childbirth
 Higginbottom GMA, Reime, B, Bharj K K, Chowbey P, Ertan K, Foster C, Friedrich K, Gerrish K, Kentenich H, Mumtaz Z and O'brien B, (2013).Migration and maternity: insights of context, health policy and research evidence on experiences and outcomes from a three-country preliminary study across Germany, Canada and the UK. Health Care for Women International. 34(11), 936-965
 Higginbottom GMA, Morgan M, O'Mahoney M, Chiu Y, Kocay D, Alexandre M and Fogeron J, (2013). Immigrant women’s experiences of postpartum depression in Canada: a protocol for systematic review using a narrative synthesis. Systematic Reviews. 65
 Higginbottom GMA, Safipour J, Mumtaz Z, Patton P and Chiu Y, (2013). "I have to do what I believe": Sudanese women’s belief and resistance to hegemonic practices at home and during experiences of maternity care in Canada. BMC Pregnancy and Childbirth. 51
Salway S, Barley R, Allmark P, Gerrish K, Higginbottom GMA and Ellison G (2011). Ethnic diversity in social science research: ethical and scientific rigour. Joseph Rowntree Foundation.
 Higginbottom, GMA and Serrant-Green,L (2005). "Developing Culturally Sensitive Skills in Health and Social Care with a Focus on Conducting Research with African Caribbean Communities in England". The Qualitative Report. 10 (4): 662–686. ISSN 1052-0147.
 Higginbottom GMA, Marsh P, Kirkham M, Owen Jm.Gma, Mathers N. (2006). "Young people of minority ethnic origin in England and early parenthood: views from young parents and service providers". Social Science & Medicine. 63 (4): 858–870. doi:10.1016/j.socscimed.2006.03.011

References

Black British women academics
Living people
English people of Ghanaian descent
Alumni of the University of Sheffield
Academics of the University of Nottingham
Black British people in health professions
British women nurses
British midwives
Members of the Order of the British Empire
1955 births